Theodore Joseph Norbert (May 17, 1908 - August 19, 1991) was a long-time minor league baseball player who is now in the Pacific Coast League Hall of Fame.

Norbert played 19 seasons in the minor leagues from 1930 to 1948, hitting .306 with 2,491 hits, 493 doubles and 313 home runs. He eclipsed the 20 home run mark in a season ten times, the 25 homer mark five times and the 30 mark once. He hit as many as 46 doubles (which he did three times) and 13 triples in a season, and he had career highs of 192 hits and 677 at-bats. He played in the Pacific Coast League every year from 1935 to 1945, except for 1943.

Teams he played for included the San Francisco Seals (1935–40), Portland Beavers (1941–42), Los Angeles Angels (1944), and Seattle Rainiers (1945–46). He led the PCL in home runs in four different seasons: 1938, 1941, 1942 and 1945. In addition to his PCL home run title in 1942, Norbert captured the league's batting title that season as well. He won a PCL Championship in 1935 as a member of the San Francisco Seals.  Norbert was one of four players, and cash, traded to the San Francisco Seals by the New York Yankees in late 1934 for Joe DiMaggio.

Norbert managed the Victoria Athletics from 1947 to 1949, being replaced by Earl Bolyard partway through the 1949 season.

References

1908 births
1991 deaths
Albany Senators players
Baltimore Orioles (IL) players
Binghamton Triplets players
Chambersburg Young Yanks players
Los Angeles Angels (minor league) players
Major League Baseball scouts
Milwaukee Brewers (minor league) players
Minor league baseball managers
Newark Bears (IL) players
Philadelphia Phillies scouts
Portland Beavers players
St. Paul Saints (AA) players
San Francisco Seals (baseball) players
Scranton Miners players
Seattle Rainiers players
Sportspeople from Brooklyn
Baseball players from New York City
Springfield Rifles players
Syracuse Chiefs players
Victoria Athletics players